Topo Volcano is an inactive shield volcano located on Pico Island, Azores. The volcano measures  in height and occupies the southernmost area of the island. It is part of the Lajes (or Topo) Volcanic Complex, the oldest volcanic apparatus which gave origin to the island, around 300,000 years ago.

References

Mountains of Portugal
Volcanoes of Portugal
Pico Island
One-thousanders of Portugal
Geology of the Azores
Polygenetic shield volcanoes